The 2017–18 DFB-Pokal was the 75th season of the annual German football cup competition. Sixty-four teams participated in the competition, including all teams from the previous year's Bundesliga and the 2. Bundesliga. The competition began on 11 August 2017 with the first of six rounds and ended on 19 May 2018 with the final at the Olympiastadion in Berlin, a nominally neutral venue, which has hosted the final since 1985. The DFB-Pokal is considered the second-most important club title in German football after the Bundesliga championship. The DFB-Pokal is run by the German Football Association (DFB).

The defending champions were Bundesliga side Borussia Dortmund, after they defeated Eintracht Frankfurt 2–1 in the previous final. Dortmund were knocked out of the competition in the round of 16 by record winners Bayern Munich, losing 1–2.

Eintracht Frankfurt defeated Bayern Munich 3–1 in the final to claim their fifth title.

As winners, Eintracht Frankfurt automatically qualified for the group stage of the 2018–19 edition of the UEFA Europa League. They also hosted the 2018 edition of the DFL-Supercup at the start of the 2018-19 season, when they faced the champion of the 2017–18 Bundesliga, Bayern Munich.

Participating clubs
The following 64 teams qualified for the competition:

Format

Participation
The DFB-Pokal began with a round of 64 teams. The 36 teams of the Bundesliga and 2. Bundesliga, along with the top 4 finishers of the 3. Liga automatically qualified for the tournament. Of the remaining slots, 21 were given to the cup winners of the regional football associations, the Verbandspokal. The 3 remaining slots were given to the three regional associations with the most men's teams, which at the time were Bavaria, Lower Saxony, and Westphalia. The runner-up of the Lower Saxony Cup was given the slot, along with the best-placed amateur team of the Regionalliga Bayern. For Westphalia, the winner of a play-off between the best-placed team of the Regionalliga West and Oberliga Westfalen also qualified. As every team was entitled to participate in local tournaments which qualified for the association cups, every team could in principle compete in the DFB-Pokal. Reserve teams and combined football sections were not permitted to enter, along with no two teams of the same association or corporation.

Draw
The draws for the different rounds were conducted as following:

For the first round, the participating teams were split into two pots of 32 teams each. The first pot contained all teams which had qualified through their regional cup competitions, the best four teams of the 3. Liga, and the bottom four teams of the 2. Bundesliga. Every team from this pot was drawn to a team from the second pot, which contained all remaining professional teams (all the teams of the Bundesliga and the remaining fourteen 2. Bundesliga teams). The teams from the first pot were set as the home team in the process.

The two-pot scenario was also applied for the second round, with the remaining 3. Liga and/or amateur team(s) in the first pot and the remaining Bundesliga and 2. Bundesliga teams in the other pot. Once again, the 3. Liga and/or amateur team(s) served as hosts. This time the pots did not have to be of equal size though, depending on the results of the first round. Theoretically, it was even possible that there could be only one pot, if all of the teams from one of the pots from the first round beat all the others in the second pot. Once one pot was empty, the remaining pairings were drawn from the other pot with the first-drawn team for a match serving as hosts.

For the remaining rounds, the draw was conducted from just one pot. Any remaining 3. Liga and/or amateur team(s) were the home team if drawn against a professional team. In every other case, the first-drawn team served as hosts.

Match rules
Teams met in one game per round. Matches took place for 90 minutes, with two halves of 45 minutes. If still tied after regulation, 30 minutes of extra time were played, consisting of two periods of 15 minutes. If the score was still level after this, the match was decided by a penalty shoot-out. A coin toss decided who took the first penalty. A total of seven players were allowed to be listed on the substitute bench, with up to three substitutions being allowed during regulation. After approval by the IFAB during the previous season, the use of a fourth substitute was allowed in extra time as part of a pilot project. From the quarter-finals onward, a video assistant referee was appointed for all DFB-Pokal matches. Though technically possible, VAR was not used for home matches of Bundesliga clubs prior to the quarter-finals in order to provide a uniform approach to all matches.

Suspensions
If a player received five yellow cards in the competition, he was then suspended from the next cup match. Similarly, receiving a second yellow card suspended a player from the next cup match. If a player received a direct red card, they were suspended a minimum of one match, but the German Football Association reserved the right to increase the suspension.

Champion qualification
The winner of the DFB-Pokal, Eintracht Frankfurt, earned automatic qualification for the group stage of next year's edition of the UEFA Europa League. As winner, they also hosted the 2018 DFL-Supercup at the start of the next season, and faced the champion of the previous year's Bundesliga, Bayern Munich.

Schedule

All draws were generally held at the German Football Museum in Dortmund, on a Sunday evening at 18:00 after each round. The draws were televised on ARD's Sportschau, broadcast on Das Erste. From the quarter-finals onwards, the draw for the DFB-Pokal der Frauen also took place at the same time.

The rounds of the 2017–18 competition were scheduled as follows:

Matches
A total of sixty-three matches took place, starting with the first round on 11 August 2017 and culminating with the final on 19 May 2018 at the Olympiastadion in Berlin.

Times up to 28 October 2017 and from 25 March 2018 are CEST (UTC+2). Times from 29 October 2017 to 24 March 2018 are CET (UTC+1).

First round
The draw for the first round was held on 11 June 2017 at 18:00, with Sebastian Kehl drawing the matches. The thirty-two matches took place from 11 to 14 August 2017.

Second round
The draw for the second round was held on 20 August 2017 at 18:00, with Carolin Kebekus drawing the matches. The sixteen matches took place from 24 to 25 October 2017.

Round of 16
The draw for the round of 16 was held on 29 October 2017 at 18:00, with Stefan Effenberg drawing the matches. The eight matches took place from 19 to 20 December 2017.

Quarter-finals
The draw for the quarter-finals was held on 7 January 2018 at 18:00, with Oliver Roggisch drawing the matches. The four matches took place from 6 to 7 February 2018.

Semi-finals
The draw for the semi-finals was held on 11 February 2018 at 18:00, with Andreas Köpke drawing the matches. The two matches took place from 17 to 18 April 2018.

Final

The final took place on 19 May 2018 at the Olympiastadion in Berlin.

Bracket
The following is the bracket which the DFB-Pokal resembled. Numbers in parentheses next to the match score represent the results of a penalty shoot-out.

Top goalscorers
The following are the top scorers of the DFB-Pokal, sorted first by number of goals, and then alphabetically if necessary. Goals scored in penalty shoot-outs are not included.

Notes

References

External links
 
DFB-Pokal on kicker.de 

2017-18
2017–18 in German football cups